The Parramatta River railway bridge is a heritage-listed former railway bridge and now cycleway which carried the Main Northern line across the Parramatta River between the suburbs of Meadowbank and Rhodes in the City of Canada Bay local government area of Sydney, New South Wales, Australia. The railway bridge was designed by John Whitton and built in 1886. The bridge is also known as the Meadowbank Rail Bridge over Parramatta River, erroneously the John Whitton Bridge and the Meadowbank-Rhodes Railway Bridge. The property is owned by RailCorp, an agency of the Government of New South Wales. It was added to the New South Wales State Heritage Register on 2 April 1999.

History 

The bridge was built in 1886.

In 1980, a new parallel bridge, the John Whitton Bridge,  was built to carry the train line and the historic bridge was taken out of use. After twenty years of disuse, it was converted to a pedestrian bridge and cycleway in the lead-up to the 2000 Summer Olympics.

In 2016, the local mayor and state opposition expressed concern about the deteriorating state of the bridge and called upon the state government to fund repairs and confirm their future plans for the bridge.

Heritage listing 
The Meadowbank-Rhodes bridge is one of twelve double lattice girder bridges that survive substantially intact in the NSW railway system. As such it is of exceptional heritage significance as evidence of a short lived but highly popular approach to bridge design in which the spanning girders were reinforced by a lattice of bars, adjusted to suit changing structural forces. This bridge is the largest double track lattice girder bridge to be prefabricated in England for export to Australia and has significant variations on the standardised design. The bridge is one of the most architecturally impressive nineteenth century Australian railway structures. A unity in design, lively detail, skilful use of materials and fine workmanship is displayed by the bridge and its abutments. The Meadowbank-Rhodes bridge is an exceptional piece of early Australian railway engineering.

Meadowbank Rail Bridge over Parramatta River was listed on the New South Wales State Heritage Register on 2 April 1999.

Engineering heritage award 
The bridge received a Historic Engineering Marker from Engineers Australia as part of its Engineering Heritage Recognition Program.

See also 

Bike paths in Sydney
:Category:Railway bridges in New South Wales

References

Bibliography

Attribution

External links

New South Wales State Heritage Register
Cyclist bridges in Australia
Pedestrian bridges in Australia
Articles incorporating text from the New South Wales State Heritage Register
Meadowbank
1886 establishments in Australia
Bridges completed in 1886
Recipients of Engineers Australia engineering heritage markers